Sean Estrada (born May 23, 1985) is a former American football guard and center who played for the San Francisco 49ers of the National Football League. He was originally signed by the 49ers as an undrafted free agent in 2007. He played college football at Pennsylvania. He attended Servite High School and graduated in 2003.

While at the University of Pennsylvania Sean lettered in football for 3 years. He was a two time All-Ivy League guard who was elected Unanimous First-team All-Ivy League his senior year. He also served as team captain for the Quakers in the 2006 season.

In 2008, Sean played with the San Jose SaberCats in the Arena Football League. The Sabercats lost in the ArenaBowl to the Philadelphia Soul that year. This was this last year of the AFL before it filed for bankruptcy.

In 2009, Sean played with the New York Sentinels in the inaugural season of the United Football League.

External links
 San Francisco 49ers bio
 Daily Pennsylvanian: Sean Estrada
 Pennsylvania Quakers bio
 Sean Estrada Penn Quaker Football Highlights

1985 births
Living people
Sportspeople from Orange, California
American football offensive guards
American football offensive tackles
Oklahoma Sooners football players
Penn Quakers football players
San Francisco 49ers players
Servite High School alumni